Janus: A Summing Up is a 1978 book by Arthur Koestler, in which the author develops his philosophical idea of the holarchy. First introduced in Koestler's 1967 book, The Ghost in the Machine, the holarchy provides a coherent way of organizing knowledge and nature all together. The idea of the holarchy is that everything we can think of is composed of holons (simultaneously both part and whole), so that each holon is always a constituent of a larger one and yet also contains other holons that are constituents of a lower level system within. Every holon is like a two-faced Janus, the Roman god: one side (the whole) looks down (or inward); the other side (the part) looks up (or outward). Each whole is a part of something greater, and each part is in turn an organizing whole to the elements that constitute it. Koestler believed that everything in a healthy system is organized this way, from the human body, to chemistry to the history of philosophy.

The concept of holon, however, is closely integrated in Janus with the theory of complex systems as was developed by Ludwig von Bertalanffy and Herbert Simon, both well known investigators and friends of Koestler. Janus put together one of the first broad based arguments for incorporating the theory of complex systems into the philosophy of science and epistemology.

Editions
Hutchinson, 1978, U.K, hardcover edition 
Random House, 1978, U.S. hardcover edition 
Picador, 1979, or Pan Macmillan, 1983 UK paperback editions 
Vintage Books, 1979, U.S. paperback edition

See also
Holism

External links
 Read excerpts at tamilnation.org

1978 non-fiction books
Books by Arthur Koestler
Cognitive science literature
Consciousness studies
English-language books
Philosophy books
Hutchinson (publisher) books